Lazarus Mohapi is the current Anglican Dean of Bloemfontein in South Africa: he was installed on 10 March 2013.

References

Living people
Deans of Bloemfontein
21st-century South African Anglican priests
Year of birth missing (living people)